The Mysterious X is a 1914 Danish silent drama film directed by Benjamin Christensen. It was Christensen's directorial debut. Prints of the film exist in the Det Danske Filminstitut and the Museum of Modern Art.

Cast
 Benjamin Christensen as Løjtnant van Hauen
 Karen Caspersen as Fru van Hauen
 Otto Reinwald as the oldest son
 Fritz Lamprecht as Kontreadmiral van Hauen
 Amanda Lund as Gamle Jane, barnepige
 Hermann Spiro as Grev Spinelli
 Bjørn Spiro as Johnny, the youngest son

References

External links
 

1914 films
1914 drama films
Danish drama films
Danish-language films
Danish silent films
Danish black-and-white films
Films directed by Benjamin Christensen
1914 directorial debut films
Silent drama films